"Help Pour Out the Rain (Lacey's Song)" is a song written and recorded by American country music artist Buddy Jewell.  It was released in May 2003 as the lead-off single from his self-titled debut album. It peaked at number 3 on the United States Billboard Hot Country Singles & Tracks chart and at number 29 on the U.S. Billboard Hot 100 chart. The song was the highest-debuting single by a new country artist since the inception of Nielsen SoundScan in 1990.

Content
"Help Pour Out the Rain" is sub-titled "Lacey's Song" for Jewell's daughter. In the song, the narrator and his daughter are riding in a car. The daughter asks him questions about what will happen when she dies and goes to Heaven. In the second verse, the narrator thanks God for his children and their innocence.

Critical reception
Deborah Evans Price, of Billboard magazine reviewed the song favorably, saying that Jewell "incorporates several of the elements that always seem to strike a chord with country audiences - the wisdom of children, a glimpse of heaven, and a father's love." She goes on to say that the song is "enveloped in a pretty melody laced with a sweet, soaring fiddle."

Music video
The music video was filmed on May 26, 2003. It was directed by Jon Small and Don Lepore.

Chart performance
"Help Pour Out the Rain (Lacey's Song)" debuted at number 44 on the U.S. Billboard Hot Country Singles & Tracks for the week of May 24, 2003.

Year-end charts

References

2003 debut singles
2003 songs
Buddy Jewell songs
Song recordings produced by Clint Black
Columbia Records singles